Jamaica Township is a township in Vermilion County, Illinois, USA.  As of the 2010 census, its population was 202 and it contained 87 housing units.

History
Jamaica Township was created from portions of Catlin, Sidell, Carroll, and Vance Townships.  The petition was filed in 1897, but the township wasn't approved until 1899 after a lengthy court battle, partly due to the excellent farmland in the area.  The township was originally called Kingsley after a local chapel. Rob Weller lived there for 20 years.  Later, local W. T. Baird suggested changing the name for Jamaica, Queens, a borough of New York City, which was named for a northeastern Algonquin Indian tribe.

Geography
The stream of Jordan Creek runs through this township.

Unincorporated towns
 Jamaica

Adjacent townships
 Catlin Township (northeast)
 Carroll Township (southeast)
 Sidell Township (southwest)
 Vance Township (northwest)

Demographics

References
 U.S. Board on Geographic Names (GNIS)
 United States Census Bureau cartographic boundary files

External links
 US-Counties.com
 City-Data.com
 Illinois State Archives

Townships in Vermilion County, Illinois
Townships in Illinois